"Where Ever U Are" is a house-dance song by international DJ & record producer  Cedric Gervais.

It was released on August 2, 2011, as the second single from Gervais' studio album "Miamication", and features vocals from Jessica Sutta, former member of the Pussycat Dolls.

Track listing

"Where Ever U Are" (Radio Edit) - 3:30
"Where Ever U Are" (Original Mix) - 7 :30

Release history

References 

2011 singles
Cedric Gervais songs
2011 songs
Ultra Music singles